The Conservation of Seals Act 1970 (c. 30) is an Act of the Parliament of the United Kingdom. It received royal assent on 29 May 1970.

Criticism

In 2007 there has been a call for better seal protection by Animal Concern and the Marine Conservation Society. The animal groups claim thousands seals are killed by fishing, fish farming and salmon angling industries. Animal welfare and conservation groups have called for new legislation to protect seals in Scottish waters. The Scottish Seals Forum is being asked to back calls to the Scottish Government for a comprehensive review of the Conservation of Seals Act 1970 after severe declines in common seal populations.

See also
 Animal welfare in the United Kingdom

References

External links
The Seal Conservation Society
Natural England: Application for a licence to kill/take seals

UK Legislation 

United Kingdom Acts of Parliament 1970
Animal welfare and rights legislation in the United Kingdom
Seal conservation